The palm thrushes are medium-sized insectivorous birds in the genus Cichladusa. They were formerly in the thrush family Turdidae, but are now treated as part of the Old World flycatcher Muscicapidae.

These are tropical African species which nest in palm trees or buildings.

The genus includes the following species:

 Collared palm thrush, Cichladusa arquata
 Rufous-tailed palm thrush, Cichladusa ruficauda
 Spotted palm thrush, Cichladusa guttata

References

 
Taxa named by Wilhelm Peters